The Gigaset ME is an Android smartphone by Gigaset Mobile which was widely associated with the line of DECT telephones by Siemens. It will be the Siemens' second smartphone after SX1 which was unveiled more than a decade ago. It was announced in February 2016. Gigaset does not use Google's standard keyboard but installs the popular alternative "SwiftKey". The Gigaset ME is a dual-SIM smartphone.

References 

Android (operating system) devices
Mobile phones introduced in 2016